The Jinnah Barrage is a barrage on the River Indus near Kalabagh, Pakistan. It is part of the Thal Project which helps irrigate  in the Sindh Sagar Doab east of the Indus. Planning for the project dates back to the nineteenth century but final plans for the barrage were made in 1919 and it was constructed between 1939 and 1946. Between 2006 and 2012, a 96 MW hydroelectric power station with four 12 MW pit turbine-generators was added on the right bank. In June 2012 a major rehabilitation project for the barrage began. New guide banks will be built and existing ones repaired. The railway bridge upstream will be rehabilitated as well. The project is expected to be complete in June 2016.

References

Barrages (dam)
Dams completed in 1946
Dams on the Indus River
Hydroelectric power stations in Pakistan
Dams in Pakistan
Mianwali District
Memorials to Muhammad Ali Jinnah